Dog Lake is a lake in Salt Lake County, Utah located near the Brighton Ski Resort.

References

Lakes of Utah
Lakes of Salt Lake County, Utah